Phillipsburg is a census-designated place (CDP) in Tift County, Georgia, United States. The population was 887 at the 2000 census.

Geography

Phillipsburg is located at  (31.439871, -83.519296).

According to the United States Census Bureau, the CDP has a total area of 0.3 square mile (0.8 km), all land.

Demographics

2020 census

As of the 2020 United States census, there were 640 people, 393 households, and 312 families residing in the CDP.

2000 census
As of the census of 2000, there were 887 people, 319 households, and 221 families residing in the CDP. The racial makeup of the CDP was 2.48% White, 94.48% African American, 0.11% Native American, 2.14% from other races, and 0.79% from two or more races. Hispanic or Latino of any race were 2.37% of the population.

There were 319 households, out of which 31.0% had children under the age of 18 living with them, 33.5% were married couples living together, 31.3% had a female householder with no husband present, and 30.7% were non-families. 27.0% of all households were made up of individuals, and 9.7% had someone living alone who was 65 years of age or older. The average household size was 2.78 and the average family size was 3.41.

In the CDP, the population was spread out, with 31.0% under the age of 18, 8.6% from 18 to 24, 28.5% from 25 to 44, 20.7% from 45 to 64, and 11.2% who were 65 years of age or older. The median age was 33 years. For every 100 females, there were 83.6 males. For every 100 females age 18 and over, there were 78.9 males.

The median income for a household in the CDP was $18,000, and the median income for a family was $22,589. Males had a median income of $18,208 versus $20,398 for females. The per capita income for the CDP was $8,237. About 26.3% of families and 33.6% of the population were below the poverty line, including 41.9% of those under age 18 and 39.6% of those age 65 or over.

References

Census-designated places in Tift County, Georgia
Census-designated places in Georgia (U.S. state)